George Silas Curtis (19 July 1845 – 6 October 1922) was an Australian politician. He was a member of the Queensland Parliament twice, first as the Independent member for Rockhampton in the Legislative Assembly from 1893 to 1902 and then as a conservative member of the Legislative Council from 1914 to 1922.

References

1845 births
1922 deaths
Independent members of the Parliament of Queensland
Members of the Queensland Legislative Assembly
Members of the Queensland Legislative Council
Place of birth missing